Temur Rakhimov (born 8 July 1997) is a Tajikistani judoka.

He is the bronze medallist of the 2019 Judo Grand Prix Marrakesh and he represented Tajikistan at the 2020 Summer Olympics

He won one of the bronze medals in his event at the 2022 Judo Grand Slam Tel Aviv held in Tel Aviv, Israel.

References

External links
 
 
 

1997 births
Living people
Tajikistani male judoka
Judoka at the 2020 Summer Olympics
Olympic judoka of Tajikistan
21st-century Tajikistani people